Mimopsacothea enganensis is a species of beetle in the family Cerambycidae, and is the only species in the genus Mimopsacothea. It was described by Breuning in 1973.

References

Lamiini
Beetles described in 1973